Phosphoramide is a chemical compound with the molecular formula O=P(NH2)3.  It is a derivative of phosphoric acid in which each of the hydroxyl groups have been replaced with an amino group.  Phosphoramide arises from the reaction of phosphoryl chloride with ammonia.  It is a white solid that is soluble in polar solvents.  In moist air, it hydrolyzes to an ammonium salt:
2 H2O  +  OP(NH2)3   →   NH4+[HPO3(NH2)]  +  NH3

It reacts with sodium hydroxide with loss of ammonia:
NaOH +  OP(NH2)3   →   NaO2P(NH2)2  +  NH3

The related thiophosphoryl compound P(=S)(NH2)3 was made from the reaction of thiophosphoryl chloride with ammonia.

Phosphoramides

Phosphoramide is also the parent compound for a range of derivatives called phosphoramides. An example compound is the polar solvent hexamethylphosphoramide (HMPA).

References

External links
 
 

 
Functional groups